"Knight of the Phoenix" is the syndication title to the two-hour long pilot (originally aired on NBC as just "Knight Rider") to the popular 1980s television show Knight Rider, which starred David Hasselhoff, Edward Mulhare, Richard Basehart, and William Daniels (who was uncredited as the voice of KITT). It first aired September 26, 1982, and was written by Glen A. Larson and directed by Daniel Haller. The pilot was rebroadcast as a two-part episode during further broadcast syndication.

The only regular cast member that didn't appear in the pilot is Patricia McPherson. Many celebrity guest stars were featured including Vega$'s Phyllis Davis and her sister Deborah Ludwig Davis, Baretta's Michael D. Roberts, actress Pamela Susan Shoop and former child star Barret Oliver.

Plot 

The episode begins during an evening at the Tropicana Hotel's Casino in Las Vegas where Los Angeles police detective Michael Long (Larry Anderson) is on a six-month-long special assignment to protect Tanya Walker (Phyllis Davis) and Charles Acton (Ed Gilbert), who are playing a game of craps. The two are technology executives of Consolidated Chemical Corporation, who have become the recent victims of apparent industrial espionage.

Long sees Fred Wilson (Vince Edwards) and is aware that he is giving orders to Lonnie (Shawn Southwick) to go into the elevator up to Acton's hotel suite and take pictures of the computer micro chip. Long informs his partner Muntzy (Herb Jefferson, Jr.) to keep an eye on Lonnie going into the hotel suite 214. Lonnie takes pictures of the micro chip via microfilm.

Acton then decides to call it a night and Wilson gives orders to Long to take care of Acton. Wilson asks Lonnie if she was followed or was witnessed entering the suite; she confirms that an electrician (Muntzy) may have seen her. Wilson then tells Lonnie to get out of the room (so that he can take care of the electrician in the hallway) and go east out of town where he will meet with her later. Long then tells Muntzy to follow Lonnie. Tanya and Long both convince Charles to go to the cashier to cash his stack of gambling chips he won at the craps table. Wilson then gives an order to security guard Vernon Gray (Lance LeGault), who is lurking in the shadows outside of the casino in the parking lot, to kill the electrician.

Lonnie gets into her car and Muntzy follows her outside. Long gets concerned about his undercover partner before he and Tanya run after Muntzy. Unfortunately, Muntzy is shot in the chest by Gray and both he and Wilson get into a Matador security car and take off. Muntzy soon dies in Long's hands, and is left on the ground. With Long not able to help his partner, he decides to get inside his car (a 1982 Pontiac Firebird Trans Am, black with gold trim and bowling ball hubcaps) with Tanya and follow the others out on the desert highway.

Just as Wilson, Gray, and Lonnie meet up to transfer the film, Long gets out of the car and makes a security guard named Symes drop his gun. Long is betrayed by Tanya when she pulls out her gun, revealing that she is in league with the criminals. She then shoots him in the head and leaves him to die on a desert highway. Long then collapses on the hood of his Trans Am and falls on the ground, with the headlights of the Trans Am bathing the gruesome scene in bright light. The villains then leave. Luckily, Long is soon rescued by a helicopter piloted by Devon Miles (Edward Mulhare) and eccentric billionaire philanthropist Wilton Knight (Richard Basehart), who take him to Wilton's private estate.

There, Long undergoes emergency medical attention, and later plastic surgery to reconstruct his face which was disfigured when the bullet shattered against a steel plate in his head he received during the Vietnam War. Four days later, Long is still in a coma having flashbacks of Muntzy and Tanya. When the bandages are removed an unspecified time later (presumed to be several months later), Long now has a different face and a new identity as Michael Knight (now played by Hasselhoff). Devon tells Michael that Long has been declared dead in the eyes of the law. He is then offered a job to work for the "Foundation for Law and Government" (aka FLAG), a division of the Knight Industries. Since the killers believe Long is dead, this will give him a better chance of infiltrating their organization and bringing them to justice.

Michael refuses the offer at first, but during his recovery, he becomes curious as to what the technicians are working on in a nearby garage. Wandering inside, Devon and Wilton Knight reveal that the secret project is in fact a black Pontiac Firebird Trans Am car, which Michael believes is his own original vehicle that has been modified (although it is unknown if the car really is Michael's original vehicle or not). Devon tells him that the vehicle is completely different and is the "Knight Industries Two Thousand" - a super advanced vehicle, made from an indestructible material that is controlled by an advanced artificially intelligent computer - capable of autonomously driving itself and avoiding any sort of collision. He then takes Michael out onto the open road to demonstrate the vehicle's capabilities, and is overwhelmed by what he experiences. Devon tells him that the car's computers are programmed to protect him and assist him on his missions if he takes the job with FLAG.

Later, Michael meets with Wilton Knight, who is dying from an unknown illness. On his death-bed, Wilton tells him that "one man can make a difference" and encourages him to become a modern-day knight who will protect the innocent and bring criminals to justice. After Wilton dies, Devon informs Michael that Tanya Walker and her associate Fred Wilson have achieved top positions within a Silicon Valley computer company called COMTRON. Devon suspects the criminals will embezzle millions from the company and steal their technology (only to sell it to others for large profit).

Michael sets off from FLAG headquarters and begins his investigation, but is astounded and shocked when the car's computer speaks back to him for the first time and introduces itself as the "Knight Industries Two Thousand" (KITT).  Michael is initially dismissive of KITT and refuses to interact with him at first, but the two eventually begin to bond - firstly when Michael falls asleep at the wheel and is pursued by a pair of deputy sheriffs, and KITT suggests a means of escaping prosecution. Meanwhile, as a comic relief, two bumbling car thieves try every means available to steal KITT, but to no avail. They are dumbfounded when Michael simply walks up and KITT lets him open the door without so much as a key. Eventually, they succeed in stealing KITT, only for him to trap and dispatch them to the nearest police station before returning to Michael.

Michael proceeds to the COMTRON headquarters and begins spying on the employees in a nearby bar called the House of the Rising Sun. There, he meets a waitress named Maggie (Pamela Susan Shoop), who becomes angry when Michael asks her about Tanya Walker. Maggie is fired from the bar for her outburst, but Michael finds her later to apologize. She then attempts to push KITT out of the way with her car, only to end up damaging her own car instead while KITT remains intact. He learns she is the recent widow of a COMTRON executive who she believes was murdered by Walker when he began asking "too many questions." When asked by Michael how they could cover up such an act, she says that any witnesses to his murder were COMTRON employees who were paid off to keep quiet. Arriving at Maggie's apartment, Michael meets her young son Buddy (Barret Oliver). Maggie informs Michael that COMTRON is sponsoring a demolition derby the next day. Michael thinks it's a good idea to attend and offers to take Maggie and Buddy with him.

The next day, Michael informs Devon about the derby and, to Devon's surprise, plans to enter KITT into the derby, hoping he will attract Walker's interest and allow him to get close to her. Michael takes Maggie and Buddy to the derby and enters KITT as planned. Meanwhile, Buddy slips away and gets inside KITT just as Michael starts the competition. Unable to turn back now, Michael enters the contest and gives Buddy a joy ride. KITT manages to take out every opponent on the track without so much as a scratch. This of course perks Tanya's interest, who soon begins plotting to get her hands on the amazing car. Michael drops off Maggie and an excited Buddy, then heads to a petrol station to call Devon for an update.

With KITT as bait, Michael sets an appointment to meet Tanya at the House of the Rising Sun, but upon his arrival, Michael confronts a group of thugs and a bar-room brawl ensues. Michael is arrested and is taken to jail. KITT gets into his own predicament as he gets impounded and taken to a COMTRON garage. There, technicians try to reverse engineer him, but KITT's impenetrable body armor makes getting inside impossible. Gray notes that they tried to use three diamond-bit drills to open KITT, but it did not work. After Wilson is unable to identify Michael's origins, Tanya send him to retrieve Micheal. From jail, Michael calls Devon to tell him to help him out (in which it will take him a while to get there, so they may have to rely on "other means" temporarily). Later, KITT starts up by himself, manages to escape the garage, and busts through the jail cell wall to rescue Michael before Wilson can retrieve him.

Michael then races back to COMTRON where he enters the building via KITT's ejection seat. There, he catches Walker in the act of stealing chip schematics as she prepares their getaway. Michael steals her gun and forces a confrontation. During the scuffle with a security guard, Michael (who fires a gun at the guard, something he doesn't normally do in later episodes) is shot in the shoulder and begins to lose blood. Michael flees (although it is unknown if he shot the guard or not, as the guard "vanishes" without explanation) and makes it back to KITT, who suggests that he should go to the hospital. Michael refuses and orders KITT to chase after Tanya and Wilson. Meanwhile, Wilson calls for trucks to form road blocks and orders a helicopter pilot to destroy Micheal and KITT. KITT, however, easily avoids the barricades with his armor, speed, and his Turbo Boost ability (which allows KITT to jump over obstacles).

Tanya and Wilson head to an airport where a private jet awaits them. Michael intercepts the jet and smashes the wing off the plane, causing it to explode. Tanya, who now recognizes Michael Knight as Michael Long, steps from her car and, in rage, tries to kill him point blank by shooting at the driver-side window of KITT. Despite warnings by Michael and Wilson that the glass is bulletproof, Tanya fires. The bullet ricochets off the window and hits Tanya in the chest, killing her.

As the police arrive, Michael takes off with KITT driving him to the hospital, leaving the burning plane and villains behind on the runway with the police approaching. After his recovery, Michael visits Maggie and promises her son one last ride inside KITT. Later, Michael meets Devon aboard his private jet where Michael agrees to stay with FLAG and carry out Wilton Knight's dream. They celebrate their new partnership with a drink.

Production 

The pilot episode opening scenes were filmed in Las Vegas, Nevada on the night of August 8, 1982; the recovery scenes were filmed in Los Angeles, California through the days and nights of July 26 - August 18, 1982; and the detective scenes were filmed in Silicon Valley, California through the days and night of August 19–26, 1982. 

The pilot's soundtrack includes covers songs of Quarterflash's "Harden My Heart", The Eagles' "Take It Easy" and "Peaceful Easy Feeling"; Fleetwood Mac's "Don't Stop"; James Taylor's "Carolina In My Mind"; Pat Benatar's "Hit Me With Your Best Shot", and also features Deborah Ludwig Davis who performed "Proud Mary" in a cameo for the casino scene. There is also an extra scene featuring Willie Nelson's rendition of Elvis Presley's "Always On My Mind" featured in television screenings, but not on the DVD version. 

During the first day of filming Hasselhoff mentions that he had a stomach ache in the plastic surgery/recovery scenes which caused him to convincingly moan and groan with pain. 

Michael Long is played by Larry Anderson although his voice is overdubbed by David Hasselhoff, and his name didn't appear in the screen credits. Anderson actually had chosen to be uncredited because of the overdubbing. The location was a mocked up casino in the lobby of a hotel near the Los Angeles International Airport. The make-up department had put curls in Anderson's straight hair to match Hasselhoff's, and everything had happened so fast that he went onto the set with the script "warm" in his hands.

Larry Anderson gets inside the car at the beginning leaving the hotel. Then there is a shadowy appearance of David Hasselhoff who gets out of the car, and assumes the acting role of Michael Long, and who eventually gets shot in face by Phyllis Davis's character Tanya Walker in the desert. 

The running gags of the two car thieves trying to steal K.I.T.T. were written very quickly.  The Las Vegas strip opening was now the new hotel and casino opening, which were the new inserts that were shot, after the first cut of the pilot was seven minutes too short. 

KITT's nose and dashboard configuration change slightly throughout the pilot. As Larson explained on the First Season DVD, a forty-minute "presentation" was created to sell the show. NBC and Universal initially liked the concept, but later hesitated about picking up the show. By the time they green lit the pilot and series, Larson was unable to reshoot the presentation scenes, so they were simply edited in the movie and the slight continuity problems this caused were ignored.

External links 
 
 Knight Rider Online
 Knight Rider Archive
 Knight of the Phoenix

American television series premieres
Knight Rider episodes
1982 American television episodes